Aframomum citratum is a monocotyledonous plant species in the family Zingiberaceae that was first described by C. Pereira, and given its current name by Karl Moritz Schumann.

References 

citratum